Kendra is a female name of disputed origins. Kendra is a moderately popular female first name, ranking 403 out of 4275 for females of all ages in the 1990 U.S. Census. The name was at its most popular in the United States from the mid-1980s to mid-1990s, peaking in 1987.

People
 Kendra Brooks, American politician
 Kendra Harrison, American hurdler
 Kendra Sunderland, American adult film star and webcam model
 Kendra Moyle (born 1990), American competitive pair skater
 Kendra Jade Rossi is an American model, actress, and former adult film star
 Kendra Scott, American jewelry designer, CEO
 Kendra Smith, American musician
 Kendra Wilkinson, a former girlfriend of Hugh Hefner and reality star
 Kendra, the 2009–2011 E! reality television series which follows Wilkinson's life after moving out of the Playboy Mansion
 Kendra on Top, the 2012 WE tv reality television series starring Wilkinson

Fiction
Kendra Daynes, White House Counsel in season 2 of Designated Survivor
Kendra Dumbledore, mother of Albus Dumbledore, a character in the Harry Potter novels
Kendra Krinklesac, a character from the spin-off The Cleveland Show
Kendra Mason, a character from the TV series Degrassi: The Next Generation
Kendra Quaker, a character in "13 The Musical."
Kendra Saunders, a DC Comics superheroine, known as Hawkgirl
Kendra Shaw, a character from the reimagined TV series Battlestar Galactica
Kendra Sorenson, a character in the Fablehaven series
Kendra Wilson, supporting character in PAW Patrol: The Movie
Kendra Young, a character from the TV series Buffy the Vampire Slayer

References

Given names
English given names
English-language feminine given names